"Daydreamin'" is the third single taken from Lupe Fiasco's album Lupe Fiasco's Food & Liquor (2006) and features soul singer Jill Scott. The song won Best Urban/Alternative Performance at the 50th Annual Grammy Awards, earning Fiasco his first Grammy and Scott's third. In 2023 the single was certified platinum by the RIAA for sales of over 1 million copies.

Background
The single is based on a sample of "Daydream in Blue" by I Monster, a song that samples "Daydream" by Gunter Kallmann Choir (which in itself is a cover, the original being written by The Wallace Collection). The song's lyrics depict an adventure being experienced through the eyes of a robot. The song's lyrics are also a critique of pop culture, especially of the current state of hip hop music.

The song was released in the UK and US on September 11, 2006; however, a download-only version was available one week earlier and charted at #46 (without any physical sales).

In 2008 "Daydreamin'" won the Grammy Award for Best Urban/Alternative Performance. It was ranked the best rap song of 2006 by many publications. "Daydreamin'" featured in a 2008 AT&T commercial for a Samsung phone.

In January 2022, Lupe Fiasco revealed that producer & CEO of Atlantic Records Craig Kallman forced the song onto Fiasco's Food and Liquor album "or it wasn't coming out". Fiasco also revealed that he receives no royalties or revenue from the Grammy-winning song.

Music video
A music video was created for the song; it shows Lupe Fiasco at a record store, where he meets and befriends a robot. Jill Scott is shown in a video projected on the wall, singing with a flower in her hair in a manner reminiscent of Billie Holiday.

Remixes
Young Buck did a freestyle remix over the instrumental to this song, and is the first track, featured on G-Unit Radio Pt. 24: The Clean Up Man.

Chamillionaire made a remix on his Mixtape Messiah 7.

Track listings

CD: 1
 "Daydreamin'" (featuring Jill Scott)
 "Kick, Push" (remix) (featuring Pharrell)

CD: 2
 "Daydreamin'" (featuring Jill Scott)
 "Kick, Push" (remix) (featuring Pharrell)
 "Daydreamin'" (Video)

12" Vinyl
 "Daydreamin'" (radio edit) (featuring Jill Scott)
 "Daydreamin'" (instrumental)
 "Daydreamin'" (album version) (featuring Jill Scott)
 "Theme Music to a Drive-By"

Charts
The song was not a major success on the Billboard charts, but it did begin to pick up steam on the digital download charts, peaking at #26 on the iTunes hip-hop/rap charts and #32 on the Amazon hip-hop/rap charts as of May 1, 2008.

In popular culture
A further remixed version of I Monster's work is used in the 2016 episode "eps2.0_unm4sk-pt1.tc" in Season 2 of the series Mr. Robot, which is often mistaken for the Lupe Fiasco version. The music that appears in the show uses parts that only appear in the 1998 song, and no vocals or changes from the Fiasco version are present.

References

External links
 "Daydreamin'" (Feat. Jill Scott) (Live at Raymann in the Netherlands)

2006 singles
Lupe Fiasco songs
Jill Scott (singer) songs
Songs written by Lupe Fiasco
Grammy Award for Best Urban/Alternative Performance
Songs written by Jill Scott (singer)
2006 songs
Atlantic Records singles